Agriophara diminuta is a moth in the family Depressariidae. It was described by Rudolph Rosenstock in 1885. It is found in Australia, where it has been recorded from South Australia and Tasmania.

The wingspan is 16–18 mm. The forewings are fuscous-grey, irrorated with whitish and with a short blackish dash beneath the costa near the base, and another on the submedian fold at one-third. There are three transverse series of obscure marks formed by a blackish irroration. The first straight, from one-fourth of the costa to three-fourths of the inner margin, the second from the middle of the costa very obliquely outwards to three-fourths of the disc, then sharply angulated and continued to the middle of the inner margin, crossing the first on the fold. The third is found from three-fifths of the costa very obliquely outwards to near the apex, then curved around near the hindmargin to the anal angle. The hindwings are grey, somewhat darker towards the apex.

References

Moths described in 1885
Agriophara
Moths of Australia